James Frederick Crawford (born September 29, 1950) is a former professional baseball pitcher. Crawford pitched in all or part of five seasons in Major League Baseball between 1973 and 1978. He appeared in 181 games, all but 14 in relief.

High school
Jim attended Tucson High Magnet School in Tucson, Arizona. He was originally drafted right out go high school in the 14th round (324th overall) of the 1969 June Baseball draft by the San Diego Padres but did not sign and chose to pitch at Arizona State University. After his four years there, he was drafted in the 14th round (321st overall) of the 1972 June Baseball draft by the Houston Astros.

Major-league career
Crawford was traded along with Milt May and Dave Roberts from the Astros to the Detroit Tigers for Leon Roberts, Terry Humphrey, Gene Pentz and Mark Lemongello on December 6, 1975.

References

External links

1950 births
Living people
Arizona State Sun Devils baseball players
Baseball players from Chicago
Columbus Astros players
Covington Astros players
Denver Bears players
Detroit Tigers players
Evansville Triplets players
Houston Astros players
Iowa Oaks players
Major League Baseball pitchers
Tiburones de La Guaira players
American expatriate baseball players in Venezuela
Tucson High School alumni
Anchorage Glacier Pilots players